Glenn Phillips is a guitarist and composer with 18 albums released under his own name. He has also played on many other recordings, including those by his first group, the Hampton Grease Band.

Career
Phillips was a founding member, guitarist and songwriter for the obscure Hampton Grease Band, which formed in 1967. Their double album Music to Eat was released on Columbia Records in 1971 and went on to become a much sought-after collector's item. It was also cited as an influence by later groups like Widespread Panic, Phish, and Pere Ubu. In 1996, it was rereleased by Sony to a great deal of acclaim (In June 1996, Spin magazine gave it a 9 out 10 "Near Perfect" rating). Over the course of the band's six-year career, they played with a wide variety of groups, including the Grateful Dead, Jimi Hendrix, The Allman Brothers Band and Frank Zappa. Zappa was a big fan of the band, and they played with him at the Fillmore East; Phillips jammed with Zappa that evening, as did John Lennon and Yoko Ono.
 
Phillips' solo career began in 1973. He frequently sat in with Little Feat back then, and in an interview, Lowell George called him "the most amazing guitarist I've ever seen." Phillips recorded his first solo album Lost at Sea in his home and put it out himself in 1975. The record anticipated the do-it-yourself movement that later overtook rock music. The highly influential British BBC Radio 1 disk-jockey John Peel regularly played the album, at the time available in the Uk only as an import; it subsequently came second in a reader's poll held by Britain's leading music paper Melody Maker. Phillips was then contacted by the head of Virgin Records, Richard Branson (later to start up further companies under the Virgin brand) who signed Phillips and released Lost at Sea on Virgin's subsidiary Caroline Records label. To support this release, Phillips toured Europe extensively - including a show at London's famous Rainbow Theatre.

Since then, Phillips has toured frequently, and the fact that his music fits into no particular niche has led to a wide spectrum of double-bills over the years with groups as varied as Captain Beefheart, Eric Johnson, Bo Diddley, Patti Smith, Roy Buchanan, Talking Heads, Albert King, Joe Satriani and The Ventures. During that time, his albums have garnered a great deal of critical acclaim, and those reviews focus on the unique, unclassifiable nature of his music; its intensely emotional impact; and his seemingly limitless virtuosity. Guitar World (Nov. 1983) compared him to Hendrix and Jeff Beck, and his double-CD retrospective Echoes 1975-1985 received a 4-star review in Rolling Stone (Jan. 21, 1993), as did his Supreme Court album with Jeff Calder (of The Swimming Pool Q's).

Phillips has also collaborated with Bob Weir of the Grateful Dead and Pete Buck of R.E.M., who said this about him in Musician magazine: "One of the reasons I don't play solos is because I grew up listening to Glenn Phillips. He never ceases to amaze me." He's also recorded several albums with Henry Kaiser (one of which received San Francisco's coveted Bammy award). His music has regularly been played on NPR since 1990.

In 2015 Mike Holbrook interviewed Phillips on his radio show and followed it with a live performance of "Dogs" from the Lost at Sea album. Phillips was able to explain that the tune had been inspired by the first dog Phillips had owned as an adult, given to him by Holbrook.

Selected discography

Albums 

Music to Eat (1971)  US  30581 & 30582 Holland  S66296 double album, (1996) US Shotput/Sony/Legacy C2K 67483 
Lost at Sea (1975) US , rest of world  1519/Virgin - reissued in 2015 on Shagrat Records as a double-vinyl set with various previously-unreleased alternate takes
Swim in the Wind (1977) Virgin 2087
Dark Lights (1980)  US 
Razor Pocket (1982)  US 
St. Valentine's Day (1984)  US 
Live (1985)  US  82006
Elevator (1987)  US SST 136, SST CD 136
Scratched by the Rabbit (1990) US ESD 80432, rest of world  
Supreme Court Goes Electric (1994)  US  
Walking through Walls (1996) US Shotput/Sony WK3700
Angel Sparks (2003) US  GM456
Guitar Party (2003)  -  US  GM 0130 
Sun Hex (2010)  with  &  US  SS14

Singles/EPs 
Steve Hillage/Glenn Phillips (1977) Virgin VDJ 23 promotional tour single contains "Lies" from Swim in the Wind
Flyback/She Don't Know (1980) US Snow Star 3.1 single from Dark Lights

Compilation albums
Echoes 1975-1985 (1992) US East Side Digital, rest of world Virgin CDVM 9015 double CD compilation

Various Artists compilation albums
Playback (1971) US Columbia AS 23 promotional EP contains "Maria" from Music to Eat 
Audio Rumbles Vol. 1 (1997) US Ptolemaic Terrascope on "Live Impro 1970" 
No Age Compilation (1987)  US SST CD 102 contains "Vista Cruiser" from Elevator 
If 6 Was 9: A Tribute to Jimi Hendrix (1990) US Communion 18, rest of world Imaginary, on "If 6 Was 9" from Guitar Party  - 
Passed Normal Vol. 6 & 7 (1993) US FOT Records FOT PN67 on "Cobra" - recorded live at San Francisco's Great American Music Hall within a week of the same song's being recorded in a studio with the same band for Guitar Party.

Appearances on others' albums
Marrying for Money (1986)  Germany Minor Music 1010 on "Murder One"
Re-Marrying for Money (1988)  US SST CD 222 Marrying for Money LP re-released on CD with 4 extra tracks, on "Murder One"
Those Who Know History Are Doomed to Repeat It (1988)  US SST CD 198 on "Dark Star/The Other One"
Helen Wheels & the Skeleton Crew (2001)  US Jargon Records JRCD 1101
Electric Willie A Tribute To Willie Dixon (2010)  &  Yellowbird

References

Sources

Rolling Stone
 Rolling Stone- by Parke Puterbaugh, Aug. 20, 1981
 Rolling Stone- by Errol Somay, March 17, 1983
 Rolling Stone- by David Fricke, Nov. 15, 1990
 Rolling Stone- by Parke Puterbaugh, Jan. 21, 1993
 Rolling Stone- by Parke Puterbaugh, Feb 10, 1994
 Rolling Stone- by David Fricke, March 21, 1996
 Rolling Stone- by David Fricke, June 12, 2003

Guitar Player
 Guitar Player - by Jim Schwartz, Aug. 1981
 Guitar Player- by Mike Varney, Aug. 1982
 Guitar Player- by Tom Mulhern, Sept. 1983
 Guitar Player- by Tom Mulhern, Aug. 1984
 Guitar Player- by Bruce Malamut, Jan. 1986
 Guitar Player- Glenn Phillips: Have Guitar, Will Flail by Mark Dery, March 1988
 Guitar Player- by Jim Ferguson, May 1991
 Guitar Player- Glenn Phillips' Voice In the Night, May 1992
 Guitar Player- June 1996
 Guitar Player- Sept. 2003
 Spin Magazine - by Byron Cooley, June 1996
 Stereo Review - Dec. 1996 
 Stereo Review- November 1990
 Musician Magazine - Glenn Phillips' Psycho-Guitar: The Triumphs & Trials of Being Yourself by David Fricke, Feb. 1983

Musician Magazine
 Musician Magazine- by David Fricke, Aug. 1984
 Musician Magazine- by Jon Young, Jan., 1986
 Musician Magazine- April 1991

Relix
 Relix - by Mick Skidmore, May 1992
 Relix - by Mick Skidmore, Nov. 1993
 Relix - by Mick Skidmore, June 1996
 Relix - Glenn Phillips: Independently Minded, by Mick Skidmore, June 1997
 Relix - by Mick Skidmore, April/May 2003

Guitar World
 Guitar World - by Bruce Malamut, Nov. 1983
 Guitar World - by Bruce Malamut, Nov. 1984
 Guitar World - by Tom Mulhern, Jan. 1986
 Guitar World - July 1988

Guitar
 Vintage Guitar Magazine - Glenn Phillips: On His Own Terms by Willie G. Moseley, March 1998
 Vintage Guitar Magazine - by Ken Johnson, July 2003

Others
 Men's Journal- by Anthony DeCurtis, Dec. 1996
 Unknown Legends of Rock 'n' Roll by Ritchie Unterberger, 1998, Miller Freeman Books 
 Mix Magazine- Glenn Phillips: Tales Of The Unknown Guitar Hero by Bill Milkowski, June 1988
 Goldmine Magazine - Interview with Glenn Phillips by Russell Hall, 1996
 The Hartford Advocate, by Alan Bisport, July 2003
 Metroland (New York) - by David Greenberger, Sept. 2003
 New Musical Express(UK) - by John Lober, July 10, 1976
 Sounds (UK) - by Tony Mitchell, Nov. 5, 1977
 Melody Maker (UK) - July, 1976

External links
 Official Glenn Phillips site
 Official Hampton Grease Band page
 Official Supreme Court page
  - recorded at Red Clay Music Foundry May 30, 2015

American rock guitarists
American male guitarists
Guitarists from Georgia (U.S. state)
Living people
Year of birth missing (living people)